Syarikat Air Melaka Berhad Football Club  was a football club based in Malacca, Malaysia. They last played in the Malaysia M3 League. The club was formerly known as the Perbadanan Air Melaka (PAM).

History
Syarikat Air Melaka Berhad Football Club had their first major success in the 2011 season, when they won the 2011 Liga Melaka. Domestically, SAMB FC has won the Malaysia football tournament, lastly in the 2018, and been eligible to compete in the Malaysia M3 League.

They have played in the previous incarnation of third-tier division in Malaysian football, the Malaysia FAM League from 2016 until 2017. In 2018, they withdrew from the Malaysia FAM League and played in Liga Melaka Division 1. They earned promotion back into the third-tier division Malaysian football, the new Malaysia M3 League in 2019. However, for the 2020 season, they withdrew due to financial reason. Their slot in M3 League were given to Melaka City FC.

Players (2020)

Head coaches

Management team

Club personnel

Honours
Melaka League
 Division 1
  Winners (5): 2011, 2012, 2013, 2015, 2018

Kuala Lumpur League
 Division 1
  Winners (1): 2014

Affiliated clubs
 Melaka United F.C.

References

External links
 SAMB FC page

Malaysia FAM League clubs
Football clubs in Malaysia
Sport in Malacca
Malaysia M3 League